The Battle of Boquerón was fought on 16 July 1866 and the Battle of Sauce on 18 July 1866, between an allied force of Uruguayans, Brazilians, and Argentines on one side and Paraguay on the other in the Paraguayan War. The Spanish-born Uruguayan officer León de Pallejas (1816–1866) and the Paraguayan officer Elizardo Aquino were killed in the battle.

Background
Following the First Battle of Tuyutí after the Allied forces invaded Paraguay, president Francisco Solano López tried enticing the Allies into attacking his fortifications at Curupayty and Curuzú along the Paraguay River. By June 1866, López had 20,000 soldiers along the front.

Battle of Yataytí Corá
On 11 July, 2,500 Paraguayans under the command of general José E. Díaz, attacked the positions outside the main Argentine camp perimeter. The attack was stopped by dusk due to a grass fire set by the Congreve rockets, but soon resumed. By 2100, the fighting ended after the Paraguayans suffered 400 casualties and 30 wounded men captured. The Argentines lost 30 men killed, 177 wounded and 51 missing

Battle of Boquerón
López had dug two trenches during the night of 13 July, from which he planned on having snipers and artillery fire into the Brazilian left flank.  Brazilian general Guilherme de Sousa led 3,000 men from the 4th Brazilian Division in an attack on the southern trench at 0500 on 16 July, supported by three Brazilian cavalry regiments. The Paraguayans were led by colonel Elizardo Aquino who was mortally wounded after 16 hours of fighting and four counter-attacks. The Paraguayans suffered 2,000 casualties in the loss of the southern trench, while the Brazilians had 282 men killed, 1,579 wounded and 38 missing, and the Argentines lost 3 killed and 52 wounded

Battle of Sauce
The Brazilians attacked again on 18 July, the flanking movement by general José Luís Mena Barreto and a frontal assault by general Vitorino José Carneiro Monteiro. General Flores had general Sousa replace Monteiro when he was wounded. The allies lost colonels Palleja, Aguero, and Martínez. The Brazilians had 630 killed, 2,938 wounded, and 54 missing, the Argentines had 201 killed, 421 wounded, the Uruguayans had 250 casualties, while the Paraguayans had 2,500 casualties.

Aftermath
The Battle of Curuzú was soon to follow.

References

Boquerón
Boquerón
Boquerón
Boquerón
Boquerón
Boquerón
July 1866 events
History of Ñeembucú Department